The Kabardino-Balkaria constituency (No.14) is a Russian legislative constituency covering the entirety of Kabardino-Balkaria.

Members elected

Election results

1993

|-
! colspan=2 style="background-color:#E9E9E9;text-align:left;vertical-align:top;" |Candidate
! style="background-color:#E9E9E9;text-align:left;vertical-align:top;" |Party
! style="background-color:#E9E9E9;text-align:right;" |Votes
! style="background-color:#E9E9E9;text-align:right;" |%
|-
|style="background-color:"|
|align=left|Khachim Karmokov
|align=left|Independent
|
|43.92%
|-
|style="background-color:"|
|align=left|Pyotr Ivanov
|align=left|Independent
| -
|28.13%
|-
| colspan="5" style="background-color:#E9E9E9;"|
|- style="font-weight:bold"
| colspan="3" style="text-align:left;" | Total
| 
| 100%
|-
| colspan="5" style="background-color:#E9E9E9;"|
|- style="font-weight:bold"
| colspan="4" |Source:
|
|}

1995

|-
! colspan=2 style="background-color:#E9E9E9;text-align:left;vertical-align:top;" |Candidate
! style="background-color:#E9E9E9;text-align:left;vertical-align:top;" |Party
! style="background-color:#E9E9E9;text-align:right;" |Votes
! style="background-color:#E9E9E9;text-align:right;" |%
|-
|style="background-color:"|
|align=left|Vladimir Sokhov
|align=left|Our Home – Russia
|
|53.38%
|-
|style="background-color:"|
|align=left|Magomet Magometkhanov
|align=left|Independent
|
|13.77%
|-
|style="background-color:#2C299A"|
|align=left|Aleksandr Dirin
|align=left|Congress of Russian Communities
|
|8.55%
|-
|style="background-color:#019CDC"|
|align=left|Timur Ulbashev
|align=left|Party of Russian Unity and Accord
|
|6.08%
|-
|style="background-color:"|
|align=left|Yury Bednev
|align=left|Yabloko
|
|6.02%
|-
|style="background-color:"|
|align=left|Aslanbi Buranov
|align=left|Independent
|
|2.84%
|-
|style="background-color:#0D0900"|
|align=left|Azratali Zhemukhov
|align=left|People's Union
|
|2.67%
|-
|style="background-color:#000000"|
|colspan=2 |against all
|
|4.73%
|-
| colspan="5" style="background-color:#E9E9E9;"|
|- style="font-weight:bold"
| colspan="3" style="text-align:left;" | Total
| 
| 100%
|-
| colspan="5" style="background-color:#E9E9E9;"|
|- style="font-weight:bold"
| colspan="4" |Source:
|
|}

1999

|-
! colspan=2 style="background-color:#E9E9E9;text-align:left;vertical-align:top;" |Candidate
! style="background-color:#E9E9E9;text-align:left;vertical-align:top;" |Party
! style="background-color:#E9E9E9;text-align:right;" |Votes
! style="background-color:#E9E9E9;text-align:right;" |%
|-
|style="background-color:"|
|align=left|Vladimir Sokhov (incumbent)
|align=left|Independent
|
|67.39%
|-
|style="background-color:"|
|align=left|Ruslan Teuvazhukov
|align=left|Independent
|
|20.89%
|-
|style="background-color:#084284"|
|align=left|Asker Karaev
|align=left|Spiritual Heritage
|
|2.29%
|-
|style="background-color:#FF4400"|
|align=left|Supyan Bek Sheripov
|align=left|Andrey Nikolayev and Svyatoslav Fyodorov Bloc
|
|1.41%
|-
|style="background-color:#000000"|
|colspan=2 |against all
|
|5.18%
|-
| colspan="5" style="background-color:#E9E9E9;"|
|- style="font-weight:bold"
| colspan="3" style="text-align:left;" | Total
| 
| 100%
|-
| colspan="5" style="background-color:#E9E9E9;"|
|- style="font-weight:bold"
| colspan="4" |Source:
|
|}

2003

|-
! colspan=2 style="background-color:#E9E9E9;text-align:left;vertical-align:top;" |Candidate
! style="background-color:#E9E9E9;text-align:left;vertical-align:top;" |Party
! style="background-color:#E9E9E9;text-align:right;" |Votes
! style="background-color:#E9E9E9;text-align:right;" |%
|-
|style="background-color:"|
|align=left|Zaurbi Nakhushev
|align=left|United Russia
|
|70.31%
|-
|style="background-color:"|
|align=left|Adalbi Shkhagoshev
|align=left|Independent
|
|18.26%
|-
|style="background-color:"|
|align=left|Andrey Makarov
|align=left|Liberal Democratic Party
|
|2.71%
|-
|style="background-color:#C21022"|
|align=left|Aliy Atabiev
|align=left|Russian Pensioners' Party-Party of Social Justice
|
|2.61%
|-
|style="background-color:#00A1FF"|
|align=left|Aslan Gaev
|align=left|Party of Russia's Rebirth-Russian Party of Life
|
|1.07%
|-
|style="background-color:#164C8C"|
|align=left|Khakim Kuchmezov
|align=left|United Russian Party Rus'
|
|0.51%
|-
|style="background-color:#000000"|
|colspan=2 |against all
|
|3.26%
|-
| colspan="5" style="background-color:#E9E9E9;"|
|- style="font-weight:bold"
| colspan="3" style="text-align:left;" | Total
| 
| 100%
|-
| colspan="5" style="background-color:#E9E9E9;"|
|- style="font-weight:bold"
| colspan="4" |Source:
|
|}

2016

|-
! colspan=2 style="background-color:#E9E9E9;text-align:left;vertical-align:top;" |Candidate
! style="background-color:#E9E9E9;text-align:leftt;vertical-align:top;" |Party
! style="background-color:#E9E9E9;text-align:right;" |Votes
! style="background-color:#E9E9E9;text-align:right;" |%
|-
|style="background-color:"|
|align=left|Adalbi Shkhagoshev
|align=left|United Russia
|
|50.13%
|-
|style="background-color:"|
|align=left|Boris Pashtov
|align=left|Communist Party
|
|18.80%
|-
|style="background:"| 
|align=left|Ruslan Tokov
|align=left|A Just Russia
|
|15.86%
|-
|style="background-color:"|
|align=left|Safarbiy Shkhagapsoev
|align=left|The Greens
|
|14.78%
|-
|style="background:"| 
|align=left|Khasan Zhilov
|align=left|Rodina
|
|0.14%
|-
|style="background-color: " |
|align=left|Kamal Shavaev
|align=left|Communists of Russia
|
|0.11%
|-
|style="background-color:"|
|align=left|Musa Tsumaev
|align=left|Liberal Democratic Party
|
|0.10%
|-
|style="background:"| 
|align=left|Ayshat Sultanova
|align=left|Yabloko
|
|0.07%
|-
| colspan="5" style="background-color:#E9E9E9;"|
|- style="font-weight:bold"
| colspan="3" style="text-align:left;" | Total
| 
| 100%
|-
| colspan="5" style="background-color:#E9E9E9;"|
|- style="font-weight:bold"
| colspan="4" |Source:
|
|}

2021

|-
! colspan=2 style="background-color:#E9E9E9;text-align:left;vertical-align:top;" |Candidate
! style="background-color:#E9E9E9;text-align:left;vertical-align:top;" |Party
! style="background-color:#E9E9E9;text-align:right;" |Votes
! style="background-color:#E9E9E9;text-align:right;" |%
|-
|style="background-color:"|
|align=left|Adalbi Shkhagoshev (incumbent)
|align=left|United Russia
|
|69.75%
|-
|style="background-color:"|
|align=left|Boris Pashtov
|align=left|Communist Party
|
|13.81%
|-
|style="background-color: " |
|align=left|Alisoltan Nastaev
|align=left|A Just Russia — For Truth
|
|11.18%
|-
|style="background-color:"|
|align=left|Vladimir Bezgodko
|align=left|Liberal Democratic Party
|
|3.62%
|-
|style="background:"| 
|align=left|Oleg Kuzminov
|align=left|Rodina
|
|1.17%
|-
|style="background:"| 
|align=left|Irina Atamanova
|align=left|Yabloko
|
|0.34%
|-
| colspan="5" style="background-color:#E9E9E9;"|
|- style="font-weight:bold"
| colspan="3" style="text-align:left;" | Total
| 
| 100%
|-
| colspan="5" style="background-color:#E9E9E9;"|
|- style="font-weight:bold"
| colspan="4" |Source:
|
|}

Notes

References

Russian legislative constituencies
Politics of Kabardino-Balkaria